Cooma-Monaro Shire was a local government area located in the Monaro region of southern New South Wales, Australia. The area was named after the former Cooma Municipality and the former Monaro Shire, that were amalgamated to create it. The Municipality of Cooma was established in 1879, and the Monaro Shire was one of several shires established in 1906. The Monaro Shire and Cooma Municipal Council amalgamated in 1981. On 11 February 2004, Cooma-Monaro Shire absorbed a small part of the former Yarrowlumla Shire, near Michelago.

On 12 May 2016, the Cooma-Monaro Shire merged with Bombala and Snowy River shires to form the Snowy Monaro Regional Council.

The last mayor of the Cooma-Monaro Shire Council was Dean Lynch, an independent politician. Lynch was appointed as the Administrator of the merged Snowy Monaro Regional Council.

Towns and localities
The Shire developed from the village of Cooma, which was first surveyed in March 1849.  It also included the small towns of Nimmitabel, Numeralla, Bredbo and Michelago.  Other populated areas included the villages and surrounding districts of Adaminaby, Anglers Reach, Shannons Flat, Yaouk, Old Adaminaby, Peak View, Countegany, Jerangle and Rock Flat.

Council

Composition and election method
At the time of dissolution Cooma-Monaro Shire Council was composed of nine councillors elected proportionally as one entire ward. All councillors were elected for a fixed four-year term of office. The mayor was elected by the councillors at the first meeting of the council. The last election was held on 8 September 2012, and the makeup of the council was as follows:

The last Council, elected in 2012 and dissolved in 2016, in order of election, was:

References 

Former local government areas of New South Wales
2016 disestablishments in Australia